Elattoneura oculata is a species of damselfly in the family Platycnemididae known commonly as the two-spotted threadtail. It is endemic to Sri Lanka, where it is a rare species known from a few locations in the southern and central parts of the island. It lives along streams in primary rainforest habitat, an ecosystem threatened by habitat destruction and degradation.

See also
 List of odonates of Sri Lanka

References

Platycnemididae
Endemic fauna of Sri Lanka
Damselflies of Sri Lanka